Edward Joseph Boyle (May 8, 1874 – February 10, 1941) was a catcher in Major League Baseball who played for the Louisville Colonels and the Pittsburgh Pirates during the  season. Listed at 6' 3", 200 lb., Boyle batted and threw right-handed. He was born in Cincinnati, Ohio. His older brother, Jack Boyle, also played in the majors.

In a one season career, Boyle went hitless in 14 at-bats in five games (.000). In five catching appearances, he committed two errors in 22 chances for a .909 fielding percentage. Boyle started with Atlanta in 1893. He also played for Sioux City and St. Paul, both managed by Charles Comiskey. Another one of Boyle's manager, Connie Mack, said that Eddie was the most accurate catcher of the day. Boyle retired due to a foot ailment. He, with his baseball playing brother Jack Boyle, opened a saloon on W 8th street in Cincinnati. He worked at the saloon with his wife Winnifred until his death in 1941.

Boyle died in his homeland of Cincinnati, Ohio at the age of 66. He was the brother of Jack Boyle and the uncle of Buzz Boyle.

External links

Louisville Colonels players
Pittsburgh Pirates players
19th-century baseball players
Major League Baseball catchers
Baseball players from Ohio
1874 births
1941 deaths
Sioux City Cornhuskers players
Atlanta Atlantas players
St. Paul Apostles players
Toronto Canadians players
Albany Senators players
Minneapolis Millers (baseball) players